Antas may refer to:

People
 Jolanta Antas (born 1954), Polish professor of linguistics

Places
 Antas, Andalusia, Spain
 Antas, Bahia, Brazil
 Antăș, Bobâlna, Romania
 Antas de Ulla, Galicia, Spain

Other
 Temple of Antas, Italy

See also

Antes (name)